Paime is a municipality and town of Colombia in the department of Cundinamarca.

External links 

Municipalities of Cundinamarca Department